Gregg Charles Popovich (born January 28, 1949) is an American professional basketball coach and executive who is the president and head coach of the San Antonio Spurs of the National Basketball Association (NBA). Taking over as coach of the Spurs in 1996, Popovich is the longest tenured active coach in the NBA as well as all other major sports leagues in the United States. Often called "Coach Pop", Popovich has the most wins of any coach in NBA history, and is widely regarded as one of the greatest coaches in NBA history.

Popovich led the Spurs to a winning record in his first 22 full seasons as head coach, surpassing Phil Jackson for the most consecutive winning seasons in NBA history. During his tenure, the Spurs have had a winning record against every other NBA team, being a key figure of the sustained success of the Spurs throughout the 2000s and most of the 2000s and most of the 2010s. Popovich has led the Spurs to all five of their NBA titles, and is one of only five coaches in NBA history to have won five titles. He was also the head coach of the U.S. national team at the 2020 Summer Olympics, leading the team to a gold medal.

Early life
Popovich was born on January 28, 1949, in East Chicago, Indiana, to a Serbian father and Croatian mother. He graduated from Merrillville High School in 1966.

College career
Popovich attended the United States Air Force Academy. He played on the academy's Air Force Falcons men's basketball team, and in his senior year was the team's captain and leading scorer. He graduated from the Academy in 1970 with a bachelor's degree in Soviet studies. Popovich underwent Air Force intelligence training and briefly considered a career with the Central Intelligence Agency.

Popovich served five years of required active duty in the United States Air Force, during which he toured Eastern Europe and the Soviet Union with the U.S. Armed Forces Basketball Team. In 1972, he was selected as captain of the Armed Forces Team, which won the Amateur Athletic Union (AAU) championship. This earned the  guard an invitation to the 1972 U.S. Olympic Basketball Team trials.

Coaching career

Pomona-Pitzer and early career (1973–1994)
In 1973, Popovich returned to the Air Force Academy as an assistant coach under the school's head basketball coach Hank Egan. Egan later became an assistant coach under Popovich for the San Antonio Spurs. During his time as an assistant coach at the Academy, Popovich earned a master's degree in physical education and sports sciences from the University of Denver. 

In 1979, Popovich was named the head coach of the Pomona-Pitzer Sagehens, the joint men's basketball team of Pomona College and Pitzer College in Claremont, California. Popovich coached the Pomona-Pitzer men's basketball team from 1979 to 1988, leading the team to its first outright title in 68 years.

During his time as head coach at Pomona-Pitzer, Popovich became a disciple and later a close friend of head coach Larry Brown at the University of Kansas. Popovich took off the 1985–86 season at Pomona-Pitzer to become a volunteer assistant at Kansas, where he could study directly under Brown. Popovich returned to Pomona-Pitzer and resumed his duties as head coach the next season.

Following the 1987–88 season, Popovich joined Brown as the lead assistant coach for the Spurs. From 1988 to 1992, Popovich was Brown's top assistant, until the entire staff, including R. C. Buford, Alvin Gentry and Ed Manning, were fired by owner Red McCombs. Popovich moved to the Golden State Warriors for a brief stint in 1992, serving as an assistant under future Hall of Famer Don Nelson and bringing with him Avery Johnson, who had been cut by the Spurs.

San Antonio Spurs (1994–present)

In 1994, Popovich returned to San Antonio as the general manager and vice president of basketball operations after Peter Holt purchased the team. Popovich's first move was to sign Avery Johnson as the team's starting point guard. Another one of Popovich's early moves in San Antonio was to trade Dennis Rodman to the Chicago Bulls for Will Perdue. Rodman was not fond of Popovich, as Rodman said in his first book, Bad As I Wanna Be.

After the Spurs had a 3–15 start in the 1996–97 season, with David Robinson sidelined with a preseason back injury, Popovich fired coach Bob Hill on December 10, 1996 and named himself head coach. Robinson then broke his foot after only six games and was lost for the season. Sean Elliott was also limited to 39 games due to injury, and Chuck Person missed the entire season. With a reduced roster that included an aging Dominique Wilkins, the Spurs struggled and won only 17 games for the remainder of the season for an overall record of 20–62. The Spurs' disastrous season allowed them the first overall pick in the 1997 NBA draft, which they used to draft Tim Duncan out of Wake Forest University.

The Spurs blossomed as the 6'11" Duncan teamed up with the 7'1" Robinson in a "Twin Tower" offense and defense for several years. After recovering to win 56 games in 1997–1998 (Popovich's first full year as coach), the Spurs won their first NBA title in 1999.

In 2002, Popovich relinquished his position as general manager to R. C. Buford, who had served as the team's head scout. Popovich and Buford were both given their starts in the NBA in 1988 as assistants on Brown's coaching staff with the Spurs.

Popovich has won five championships with the Spurs—1999, 2003, 2005, 2007 and 2014. He was named NBA Coach of the Year in 2003, 2012, and 2014.

On April 4, 2008, Popovich returned to the U.S. Air Force Academy to receive the academy's award of Distinguished Graduate. Despite his four NBA titles at the time, Popovich said it was the most meaningful award he had ever received.

On May 2, 2012, Popovich won his second Coach of the Year Award for the 2011–12 NBA season.

On November 29, 2012, Popovich sat out starters Tim Duncan, Tony Parker, Manu Ginóbili, and Danny Green for a nationally televised game against the Miami Heat. Popovich frequently sat out his starters on road trips over the years to ensure they have enough rest for the playoffs; the Spurs' roster was among the oldest in the league. NBA commissioner David Stern was outraged by this and said on the night of the game that it was "unacceptable", and "substantial sanctions [would] be forthcoming". On November 30, Stern fined the Spurs $250,000 for what he called "a disservice to the league and the fans". According to Stern, Popovich had not informed the Heat, the league or the media in a suitable time frame that the four players were not making the trip to Miami. Stern's decision was criticized by commentator Adrian Wojnarowski of Yahoo! Sports, who said, "Stern doesn't care about the realities of his league, just the appearances. To him, the appearance on Thursday night was that Popovich had tried to embarrass him on national television and that's why the commissioner tossed that tantrum."

Popovich led the Spurs to the 2013 NBA Finals to face the Miami Heat. The series lasted seven games, but the Spurs had their first-ever Finals loss.

On April 22, 2014, Popovich was awarded the Red Auerbach Trophy as he won the NBA Coach of the Year for the third time. He also won his fifth NBA championship with San Antonio that season, beating the Heat 4–1 in the Finals.

On February 9, 2015, Popovich became the ninth coach in NBA history to win 1,000 games when the Spurs defeated the Indiana Pacers 95–93. He and Jerry Sloan are the only two coaches in NBA history to win 1,000 games with one franchise.

On August 1, 2015, Popovich served as Team Africa's head coach at the 2015 NBA Africa exhibition game.

In the 2015–16 season, Popovich led the Spurs to a franchise-high 67 wins, but he and the team lost in the conference semifinals against the Oklahoma City Thunder in six games.

On February 4, 2017, Popovich recorded his 1,128th regular season win with one franchise, surpassing Sloan.

On April 13, 2019, Popovich surpassed Lenny Wilkens and became the all-time winningest coach in NBA history with his 1,413th win (regular season and playoffs combined).

Popovich supported the comments from NBA commissioner Adam Silver surrounding the controversy with the NBA and China.

On March 27, 2021, after leading his team to a 120–104 victory against the Chicago Bulls, Popovich won his 1,300th regular season game and became the third NBA coach to reach the milestone.

On March 11, 2022, Popovich surpassed Don Nelson for most regular season wins of all time, notching his 1,336th regular season victory with the Spurs. Popovich needed 370 fewer games than Don Nelson to achieve this record.

National team career
Popovich served on the coaching staff for the U.S. men's national team during the 2002 FIBA World Championship (assisting George Karl), during the 2003 FIBA America Men's Olympic Qualifying Tournament, and during the Athens 2004 Olympic Games (assisting Larry Brown), where the U.S. team won the bronze medal.

On October 23, 2015, Popovich was named the head coach of the U.S. men's national team, taking over from Mike Krzyzewski after the Rio 2016 Olympic Games.

At the 2019 FIBA Basketball World Cup, the U.S. national team finished in seventh place, its worst finish ever in international competition.

With Popovich serving as the head coach for the U.S. men's national team, he led the team to a gold medal at the 2020 Summer Olympics in Tokyo, going 5–1 and defeating France 87–82 in the final.

Personal life

Popovich was married to Erin Popovich until her death on April 18, 2018; the couple had two children. He is a serious wine collector, and an investor in Oregon's A to Z Wineworks.

On multiple occasions, Popovich has spoken out on behalf of social justice issues, including in support of the 2017 Women's March. He also repeatedly criticized the behavior of former U.S. President Donald Trump. Popovich endorsed Joe Biden in the 2020 presidential election.

Humanitarian work
Popovich has spent considerable time and money working with several charities and nonprofits such as the San Antonio Food Bank and the Innocence Project. He also took part in Shoes That Fit, an organization that aims to deliver shoes to more than 200 students at Gates Elementary School affected by Hurricanes Irma and Maria. Popovich is helping raise funds for J/P HRO, a disaster relief program that operates in Haiti, and various disaster relief organizations in the U.S. and Caribbean.

Head coaching record

College

NBA

|-
| style="text-align:left;"|San Antonio
| style="text-align:left;"|
| 64||17||47|||| style="text-align:center;"|6th in Midwest||—||—||—||—
| data-sort-value="100" style="text-align:center;"|Missed playoffs
|-
| style="text-align:left;"|San Antonio
| style="text-align:left;"|
| 82||56||26|||| style="text-align:center;"|2nd in Midwest||9||4||5||
| data-sort-value="8" style="text-align:center;"|Lost in Conference Semifinals
|- style="background:#FDE910;"
| style="text-align:left;"|San Antonio
| style="text-align:left;"|
| 50||37||13|||| style="text-align:center;"|1st in Midwest||17||15||2||
| data-sort-value="1" style="text-align:center;"|Won NBA Championship
|-
| style="text-align:left;"|San Antonio
| style="text-align:left;"|
| 82||53||29|||| style="text-align:center;"|2nd in Midwest||4||1||3||
| data-sort-value="16" style="text-align:center;"|Lost in First Round
|-
| style="text-align:left;"|San Antonio
| style="text-align:left;"|
| 82||58||24|||| style="text-align:center;"|1st in Midwest||13||7||6||
| data-sort-value="4" style="text-align:center;"|Lost in Conference Finals
|-
| style="text-align:left;"|San Antonio
| style="text-align:left;"|
| 82||58||24|||| style="text-align:center;"|1st in Midwest||10||4||6||
| data-sort-value="8" style="text-align:center;"|Lost in Conference Semifinals
|- style="background:#FDE910;"
| style="text-align:left;"|San Antonio
| style="text-align:left;"|
| 82||60||22|||| style="text-align:center;"|1st in Midwest||24||16||8||
| data-sort-value="1" style="text-align:center;"|Won NBA Championship
|-
| style="text-align:left;"|San Antonio
| style="text-align:left;"|
| 82||57||25|||| style="text-align:center;"|2nd in Midwest||10||6||4||
| data-sort-value="8" style="text-align:center;"|Lost in Conference Semifinals
|- style="background:#FDE910;"
| style="text-align:left;"|San Antonio
| style="text-align:left;"|
| 82||59||23|||| style="text-align:center;"|1st in Southwest||23||16||7||
| data-sort-value="1" style="text-align:center;"|Won NBA Championship
|-
| style="text-align:left;"|San Antonio
| style="text-align:left;"|
| 82||63||19|||| style="text-align:center;"|1st in Southwest||13||7||6||
| data-sort-value="8" style="text-align:center;"|Lost in Conference Semifinals
|- style="background:#FDE910;"
| style="text-align:left;"|San Antonio
| style="text-align:left;"|
| 82||58||24|||| style="text-align:center;"|2nd in Southwest||20||16||4||
| data-sort-value="1" style="text-align:center;"|Won NBA Championship
|-
| style="text-align:left;"|San Antonio
| style="text-align:left;"|
| 82||56||26|||| style="text-align:center;"|2nd in Southwest||17||9||8||
| data-sort-value="4" style="text-align:center;"|Lost in Conference Finals
|-
| style="text-align:left;"|San Antonio
| style="text-align:left;"|
| 82||54||28|||| style="text-align:center;"|1st in Southwest||5||1||4||
| data-sort-value="16" style="text-align:center;"|Lost in First Round
|-
| style="text-align:left;"|San Antonio
| style="text-align:left;"|
| 82||50||32|||| style="text-align:center;"|2nd in Southwest||10||4||6||
| data-sort-value="8" style="text-align:center;"|Lost in Conference Semifinals
|-
| style="text-align:left;"|San Antonio
| style="text-align:left;"|
| 82||61||21|||| style="text-align:center;"|1st in Southwest||6||2||4||
| data-sort-value="16" style="text-align:center;"|Lost in First Round
|-
| style="text-align:left;"|San Antonio
| style="text-align:left;"|
| 66||50||16||.758|| style="text-align:center;"|1st in Southwest||14||10||4||
| data-sort-value="4" style="text-align:center;"|Lost in Conference Finals
|-
| style="text-align:left;"|San Antonio
| style="text-align:left;"|
| 82||58||24|||| style="text-align:center;"|1st in Southwest||21||15||6||
| data-sort-value="2" style="text-align:center;"|Lost in NBA Finals
|- style="background:#FDE910;"
| style="text-align:left;"|San Antonio
| style="text-align:left;"|
| 82||62||20|||| style="text-align:center;"|1st in Southwest||23||16||7||
| data-sort-value="1" style="text-align:center;"|Won NBA Championship
|-
| style="text-align:left;"|San Antonio
| style="text-align:left;"|
| 82||55||27|||| style="text-align:center;"|3rd in Southwest||7||3||4||
| data-sort-value="16" style="text-align:center;"|Lost in First Round
|-
| style="text-align:left;"|San Antonio
| style="text-align:left;"|
| 82||67||15|||| style="text-align:center;"|1st in Southwest||10||6||4||
| data-sort-value="8" style="text-align:center;"|Lost in Conference Semifinals
|-
| style="text-align:left;"|San Antonio
| style="text-align:left;"|
| 82||61||21|||| style="text-align:center;"|1st in Southwest||16||8||8||
| data-sort-value="8" style="text-align:center;"|Lost in Conference Finals
|-
| style="text-align:left;"|San Antonio
| style="text-align:left;"|
| 82||47||35|||| style="text-align:center;"|3rd in Southwest||5||1||4||
| data-sort-value="8" style="text-align:center;"|Lost in First Round
|-
| style="text-align:left;"|San Antonio
| style="text-align:left;"|
| 82||48||34|||| style="text-align:center;"|2nd in Southwest||7||3||4||
| data-sort-value="8" style="text-align:center;"|Lost in First Round
|-
| style="text-align:left;"|San Antonio
| style="text-align:left;"|
| 71||32||39|||| style="text-align:center;"|4th in Southwest||—||—||—||—
| data-sort-value="100" style="text-align:center;"|Missed playoffs
|-
| style="text-align:left;"|San Antonio
| style="text-align:left;"|
| 72||33||39|||| style="text-align:center;"|3rd in Southwest||—||—||—||—
| data-sort-value="100" style="text-align:center;"|Missed playoffs
|-
| style="text-align:left;"|San Antonio
| style="text-align:left;"|
| 82||34||48|||| style="text-align:center;"|4th in Southwest||—||—||—||—
| data-sort-value="100" style="text-align:center;"|Missed playoffs
|- class="sortbottom"
| style="text-align:center;" colspan="2"|Career
| 2,045||style="background:#E0CEF2;|1,344||701|||| ||284||170||114||||

National team
{| class="wikitable sortable collapsible " style="text-align:right;"
|+ 
|-
!Team
!Year
! data-sort-type="number" | 
! data-sort-type="number" | 
! data-sort-type="number" | 
! data-sort-type="number" | 
!Tournament
! data-sort-type="number" | 
! data-sort-type="number" | 
! data-sort-type="number" | 
! data-sort-type="number" | 
! Result
|-
| style="text-align:left;"|United States
| style="text-align:left;"|2019
| 12||9||3||
| World Cup
| 8||6||2||
| data-sort-value="7" style="text-align:center;"|7th place
|- style="background:#FFD700;"
| style="text-align:left;"|United States
| style="text-align:left;"|2021
| 10||7||3||
| Olympics
| 6||5||1||
| data-sort-value="1" style="text-align:center;"|Won gold medal
|-
| style="text-align:center;" colspan="2"|Career
| 22||16||6||
| 
| 14||11||3||
| 

Source:

See also
List of NBA championship head coaches

References

External links

 NBA.com profile
 Profile as a coach
 College playing statistics

1949 births
Living people
Air Force Falcons men's basketball coaches
Air Force Falcons men's basketball players
American men's basketball coaches
American men's basketball players
American Olympic coaches
American people of Croatian descent
American people of Serbian descent
Basketball coaches from Indiana
Basketball players from Indiana
Golden State Warriors assistant coaches
Guards (basketball)
National Basketball Association championship-winning head coaches
People from Merrillville, Indiana
Pomona College faculty
San Antonio Spurs head coaches
Sportspeople from East Chicago, Indiana
Sportspeople from San Antonio
United States men's national basketball team coaches